Główczyce is a non-operational PKP railway station in Główczyce (Pomeranian Voivodeship), Poland.

Lines crossing the station

References 
 Główczyce article at Polish Stations Database , URL accessed at 21 March 2006

Disused railway stations in Pomeranian Voivodeship
Railway stations in Pomeranian Voivodeship
Słupsk County